Vivian Bang (born October 23, 1973) is a South Korean-born American actress. She was a main cast member on television shows Sullivan & Son and Swedish Dicks. She had notable minor film roles as a bridal shower planner in Yes Man (2008) and the hippie girlfriend in Always Be My Maybe (2019).

Her film White Rabbit, directed by Daryl Wein, premiered at Sundance Film Festival in 2018.

Early life 
Born in Seoul, South Korea, Bang's family first moved to San Francisco in 1980 before settling down In Atlanta, Georgia. Bang graduated from Dunwoody High School.

She studied experimental theater/performance art at New York University's (NYU) Tisch School of the Arts. She graduated with a BFA in acting in 1996.

Career

Film and television 
She was awarded Best Actress for the Asian American Film Lab short film Elizabeth Ong Is Missing.

Bang played Steve Byrne's sister on the TBS sitcom Sullivan & Son.

Bang took on the leading role in the film White Rabbit, which she co-wrote and co-produced with director Daryl Wein. The film is about a struggling performance artist (Bang) navigating Los Angeles while financially supporting herself using the eponymous freelancing app, TaskRabbit. It premiered at the 2018 Sundance Film Festival as part of the out-of-competition NEXT lineup and was later acquired by Gravitas Ventures.

Theater 
After graduation, she toured with the Big Art Group, an experimental performance troupe.

Her theater credits include roles in Velina Hasu Houston's Calling Aphrodite, Please Stand By with Thumping Claw, Big Art Group's Shelf-Life, Flicker, and the Obie-nominated Benton Kozo.

Filmography

Film 

1997: Henry Fool
2000: Useless (short film)
2001: The Mitten (short film)
2003: Robot Stories
 2004: Little Black Book
 2004: Our Time Is Up (short film)
2008: Cute Couple (short film)
2008: Yes Man
2009: Time's [Not] Up (short film)
2010: Jeffie Was Here
2010: The Talking Head (short film)
2011: Coming & Going
2011: Boy Toy
 2011: A Holiday Heist
2013: Slightly Single in L.A.
 2014: Someone Marry Barry
 2014: Sleepover LA (short film)
 2014: If You Lived Here You'd Be Home Already (short film)
2018: White Rabbit
 2018: We the Coyotes
 2019: Always Be My Maybe
 2020: Runt
 TBA: The Parenting

Television 

 2000: The Corner (TV mini-series, 1 episode)
 2000: Sex and the City (TV series, 1 episode)
 2003: Becker (TV series, 1 episode)
 2005: House (TV series, 1 episode)
 2006: Monk (TV series, 1 episode)
 2006: How I Met Your Mother (TV series, 1 episode)
 2008: Outsourced (TV series)
 2009: Kath & Kim (TV series, 2 episodes)
 2009: Numb3rs (TV series, 1 episode)
 2009: iCarly (TV series, 1 episode)
 2009: Medium (TV series, 1 episode)
 2009–2010: Better Off Ted (TV series, 3 episodes)
 2010: ACME Hollywood Dream Role (TV series, 1 episode)
 2010: The LXD: The Legion of Extraordinary Dancers (TV series, 1 episode)
 2010: Ktown Cowboys (TV series, 1 episode)
 2011: Retired at 35 (TV series, 1 episode)
 2011: Mythomania (TV series, 4 episodes)
 2011: Matumbo Goldberg (TV series, 5 episodes)
 2012–2014: Sullivan & Son (TV series, cast member)
 2013: Status Updates (TV series, 9 episodes)
 2014: Almost Asian (TV series, 1 episode)
 2016-2017: Swedish Dicks (TV series, main cast)

Notes

Further reading 

 (2013) Interview for A Cultured Lad about Sullivan & Son
 (2013) Interview for So Fetch Daily
(2018) Interview for Film Threat about White Rabbit

External links
Bio and resume at vivianbang.com
 

1973 births
Living people
Actresses from Seoul
American film actresses
American television actresses
Tisch School of the Arts alumni
South Korean emigrants to the United States
American actresses of Korean descent
21st-century American actresses